Klipkraal is a town in Greater Letaba Local Municipality in the Limpopo province of South Africa.

References

Populated places in the Greater Letaba Local Municipality